Justi is a surname. Notable people with the surname include:

Carl Justi (1832–1912), German art historian
Ferdinand Justi (1837–1907), German linguist and Orientalist
Johann Heinrich Gottlob Justi (1717–1771), German political economist